Maxavia was a charter airline based in Bishkek, Kyrgyzstan.

The airline was on the List of air carriers banned in the European Union.

External links
Maxavia

References

Defunct airlines of Kyrgyzstan
Airlines established in 2006